The first season of Top Model aired from July to August 2005. The winner of the competition was 20-year-old Alizée Sorel from Switzerland.

Contestants
(ages stated are at start of contest)

Summaries

Call-out order

 The contestant was eliminated
 The contestant won the competition

References

External links
 Top Model 2005 M6 Official Site

France
2005 French television seasons